Cal Johnson may refer to:

 Cal Johnson (stuntman), American film stuntman and stunt coordinator
 Cal Johnson (businessman) (1844–1925), American businessman and philanthropist

See also
 Calvin Johnson (disambiguation)